Montealtosuchus was an extinct genus of terrestrial crocodyliform. It was discovered in 2004 in the Bauru Basin of Brazil, from Campanian-Maastrichtian deposits of the Adamantina Formation. The species was described in 2007, and assigned to the family Peirosauridae. The type species is M. arrudacamposi. The genus takes its name from the type locality in Monte Alto municipality.

This fossil, which was found in 2004, near the town of Monte Alto, in São Paulo state is very well preserved and quite complete. Most importantly, skull material has been found and this can help to link this fossil specimen with today's modern crocodiles. It would have grown to about 2 metres in length and would have been an active predator of smaller animals including dinosaurs. Perhaps it was more terrestrial than its modern relatives, using its semi-upright gait to pursue prey.

External links and references

Zootaxa
English - Fossil of new crocodile species found in Brazil

Terrestrial crocodylomorphs
Late Cretaceous crocodylomorphs of South America
Peirosaurids
Adamantina Formation
Fossil taxa described in 2007
Prehistoric pseudosuchian genera